Harold Fisher Dvorak is an American pathologist and vascular researcher. He is the founding Director of the Center for Vascular Biology Research at the Beth Israel Deaconess Medical Center and the Mallinckrodt Distinguished Professor of Pathology at Harvard Medical School. Dvorak is best known for his discovery of vascular endothelial growth factor (VEGF),  for which he received the Canada Gairdner International Award of 2014.

He graduated from Princeton University and Harvard Medical School.

Awards

References

American pathologists
Living people
Year of birth missing (living people)
Princeton University alumni
Harvard Medical School alumni